The 1982 Giro d'Italia was the 65th edition of the Giro d'Italia, one of cycling's Grand Tours. The Giro began in Milan, with a prologue team time trial on 13 May, and Stage 12 occurred on 27 May with a stage from Cava de' Tirreni. The race finished in Turin on 6 June.

Stage 12
27 May 1982 — Cava de' Tirreni to Campitello Matese,

Stage 13
28 May 1982 — Campitello Matese to Pescara,

Stage 14
29 May 1982 — Pescara to Urbino,

Stage 15
30 May 1982 — Urbino to Comacchio,

Stage 16
31 May 1982 — Comacchio to San Martino di Castrozza,

Stage 17
1 June 1982 — Fiera di Primiero to Boario Terme,

Stage 18
2 June 1982 — Piancogno to Montecampione,

Stage 19
3 June 1982 — Boario Terme to Vigevano,

Stage 20
4 June 1982 — Vigevano to Cuneo,

Stage 21
5 June 1982 — Cuneo to Pinerolo,

Stage 22
6 June 1982 — Pinerolo to Turin,  (ITT)

References

1982 Giro d'Italia
Giro d'Italia stages